Gary Welding (born 23 May 1964 from St Helens, Merseyside) is an English professional darts player who played in British Darts Organisation events and formerly on the Professional Darts Corporation.

Career 
From St Helens, Merseyside, Welding He is best remembered for his run to the quarter-final of the PDC World Championship in 2006, where in the first round he came from two sets down to beat world number one Colin Lloyd 3–2, Erwin Extercatte 4–1, John Kuczynski 4–2, but who losing to Wayne Jones of England he was whitewashed 5–0.

World Championship Results

PDC
 2006: Quarter Final (lost to Wayne Jones 0–5) (sets)
 2007: 1st Round (lost to Andy Hamilton 0–3)

References

1964 births
Living people
English darts players
British Darts Organisation players
Professional Darts Corporation former tour card holders